Albert Alexander R. Millard (1 October 1898 – after 1925) was an English professional footballer who played in the Football League for Birmingham, Coventry City, Crystal Palace and Charlton Athletic. He could play as a forward or at centre half with equal facility. He was Birmingham's top scorer in the 1919–20 season with 15 goals in all competitions, despite only playing half the season in attack.

Millard was born in West Bromwich, Staffordshire.

References

1898 births
Year of death missing
Sportspeople from West Bromwich
English footballers
Association football defenders
Association football forwards
Barry Town United F.C. players
Cardiff City F.C. players
Birmingham City F.C. players
Coventry City F.C. players
Crystal Palace F.C. players
Charlton Athletic F.C. players
Leamington F.C. players
English Football League players
Place of death missing